Tour de Force is an album by Brazilian guitarist Bola Sete, released in 1963 through Fantasy Records.

Release and reception 

Richie Unterberger of allmusic gave the album four and a half out of five stars, calling it "quality by-the-fire jazz bossa nova music."

In 2001, Tour de Force was issued on CD coupled with Bossa Nova on a compilation titled after the former.

Track listing

Personnel 
Johnny Rae – drums
Freddie Schreiber – bass guitar
Bola Sete – guitar

Release history

References

External links 
 

1963 albums
Bola Sete albums
Fantasy Records albums